Mozzafar Baghai (23 July 1912  18 November 1987) is known best as an Iranian political figure of the 1940s and 50s. He rose to prominence during the national struggle against British control of Iran's oil industry. For decades, most Iranians had resented the Anglo-Iranian Oil Company (51% of which was under the control of the British government) for the perceived injustice of allocating most profits to the company and the British government, while only a very small proportion was given to Iran, despite the fact that the oil fields were on Iranian territory. Baghai made himself known as a fiery critic of the British and he allied himself with those of like mind, including Dr. Mohammad Mossadegh (a man who had risen to prominence as a fierce critic of Reza Shah, the despotic ruler of Iran from 1921–1941, and of the British control of the oil fields and that country's interference in Iran's internal affairs). He was different from many other nationalists in that he held very left-wing (albeit anti-communist) views. He was able to best articulate this when he formed the Toilers Party of the Iranian Nation, a left-wing, nationalistic and anti-communist party that included such notables as Khalil Maleki (an ex-member of the Tudeh Party who broke away from that group for its dependence on the Soviet Union). In 1949, the Toilers Party joined with Mossadegh and his liberal supporters in forming the National Front of Iran, which was an umbrella organization for all Iranians who were committed to the principles of freeing Iran from foreign domination, ending arbitrary rule and establishing a government dependent on the will of the people of Iran. In April 1951, one month after the oil industry was nationalized by the Majlis, Mossadegh was chosen by that elected body as the Prime Minister of Iran, subject to approval by the reigning Mohammad Reza Shah (who had succeeded his father as Shah of Iran in Sept. 1941).

Until 1952, Baghai stood by Mossadegh in his struggle against the United Kingdom and his intensifying dispute in Iran with the pro-Shah elements, who had opposed Mossadegh's style of governing and his policies vis-a-vis the UK. From 1952 to 1953, Bagai served in the seventeenth Majlis, from which he initially used to support Mossadegh's government. But by late 1952, Baghai had become disillusioned with Mossadegh, pulling his Toilers Party out of the National Front and siding with the pro-Shah elements, who were present in the Majlis, military, press, royal court and other institutions. In taking this course, he split with Khalil Maleki, who remained loyal to Mossadegh and formed his own group called the Third Force. On 19 August 1953, the CIA and MI6 sponsored a coup d'etat against Mossadegh which succeeded in toppling his government and restoring the absolute monarchy to Iran. Due to his role in bringing down Mossadegh, Baghai was forever shunned by the ex-premier's colleagues and the Iranian public (most of whom had remained sympathetic to Mossadegh and his role in fighting imperialism abroad and despotism at home).

Baghai died in 1987.

See also
Abadan Crisis
Mahmoud Afshartous

Sources

External links

Abrahamian, Ervand, Iran Between Two Revolutions, Princeton University Press, 1982.

Anglo-Persian Oil Company
1912 births
1987 deaths
Toilers Party of the Iranian Nation politicians
National Front (Iran) MPs
Democrat Party of Iran politicians
Iranian politicians who have crossed the floor
People from Kerman Province
Members of the 15th Iranian Majlis
Members of the 16th Iranian Majlis
Members of the 17th Iranian Majlis